Wilbraham Frederic Tollemache, 2nd Baron Tollemache (4 July 1832 – 17 December 1904), was a British Conservative Member of Parliament.

Career
Tollemache was the eldest son of John Jervis Tollemache, 1st Baron Tollemache, and his first wife Georgina Louisa Best. He was elected to the House of Commons for Cheshire West in 1868 (succeeding his father), a constituency he represented until 1885. In 1890 he succeeded his father as second Baron Tollemache and took his seat in the House of Lords.

Family
Lord Tollemache married twice, and left four sons and two daughters by his first wife.

His eldest son, Hon. Lyonel Plantagenet Tollemache (1860–1902) died in August 1902 after he fainted while taking a swim. He was married to Lady Blanche Sybil King (1862–1923), only daughter and heiress of Robert King, 7th Earl of Kingston, and left two sons.

Lord Tollemache died in December 1904, aged 72, and was succeeded in the barony by his grandson Bentley Lyonel John Tollemache.

Coat of arms

References

Further reading
Kidd, Charles, Williamson, David (editors). Debrett's Peerage and Baronetage (1990 edition). New York: St Martin's Press, 1990,

External links 
 

Tollemache, Wilbraham Frederic Tollemache, 2nd Baron
Tollemache, Wilbraham Frederic Tollemache, 2nd Baron
Tollemache, Wilbraham Frederic Tollemache, 2nd Baron
Conservative Party (UK) MPs for English constituencies
UK MPs 1868–1874
UK MPs 1874–1880
UK MPs 1880–1885
UK MPs who inherited peerages
Wilbraham Frederic Tollemache, 2nd Baron Tollemache
Eldest sons of British hereditary barons